The United States national korfball team is managed by the United States Korfball Federation (USKF), representing the United States in korfball international competitions.

In 2006, Canada, along with the USA formed North America to compete in the Commonwealth and Friends Korfball Championship. Finishing 6th out of 7.

Tournament history

Current squad
National team in the World Championship 2007

 Coach: Ronald Buis

References

External links
 United States Korfball Federation

National korfball teams
Korfball
National team